Cankova is a town in the Prekmurje region of Slovenia. It is the seat of the Municipality of Cankova.

Name
Cankova was attested in historical sources as Kaltenprun sive Hydeghuth in 1366 and Hydegkwth in 1499. The Slovenian name is a clipped form of *Cankova ves 'Can(e)k's village', referring to an early person associated with the place. The German name Kaltenbrunn literally means 'cold well', and the Hungarian name Vashidegkút literally means 'cold well in Vas County'.

Church

The parish church in Cankova is dedicated to Saint Joseph and belongs to the Roman Catholic Diocese of Murska Sobota. It was built in 1754 and renovated in 1900. It has a cruciform plan with a western belfry.

Notable people
Notable people that were born or lived in Cankova include:
Ágoston Pável (1886–1946), writer. The house he was born in was renovated in 1998 and houses an exhibition about the writer.
Branko Pintarič (1967–), actor and writer
Antal Stevanecz (1861–1921), teacher and writer

References

External links

Cankova on Geopedia

Populated places in the Municipality of Cankova